The President of the Junta of Communities of Castilla–La Mancha, usually known in English as the President of Castilla–La Mancha, is the head of government of Castilla–La Mancha. The president leads the executive branch of the regional government.

The office is established under the Castilian-Manchegan Statute of Autonomy. It is occupied by Emiliano García-Page.

List of presidents

References

External links
Presidents